The Four Comely Saints is a collective name for Fursey, Brendan of Birr, Conall, and Berchán, four saints in the early Irish Christian church.

At their reputed burial place on Inishmore is a ruined fifteenth-century church dedicated to them.  A reputed miraculous cure at the adjacent holy well inspired John Millington Synge's play The Well of the Saints.

References

Quartets
Medieval Irish saints
6th-century Christian saints
Aran Islands